Maurice King is a former Vincentian weightlifter.

King represented the British West Indies at the 1959 Pan American Games in Chicago, USA, taking silver in the Bantamweight division.
At the 1966 British Empire and Commonwealth Games in Kingston, Jamaica, King represented St Vincent and the Grenadines in the 67.5 kg Combined competition.

References

Pan American Games bronze medalists for the British West Indies
Weightlifters at the 1959 Pan American Games
Commonwealth Games competitors for Saint Vincent and the Grenadines
Weightlifters at the 1966 British Empire and Commonwealth Games
Pan American Games medalists in weightlifting
Medalists at the 1959 Pan American Games